Hofmans is a Dutch-language surname and a  variant of Hofman. It may refer to:

David Hofmans (born 1943), American horse-trainer
Greet Hofmans (1894–1968), Dutch faith-healer
Gunther Hofmans (born 1967), Belgian footballer

Dutch-language surnames